Preetham Gubbi is an Indian film screenwriter turned director who works in Kannada film industry. He made his debut as a script writer for the blockbuster Kannada film Mungaru Male in 2006. He debuted as a director for the film Haage Summane in 2009.

Personal life
Preetham is the grandson of the theater artist Gubbi Veeranna. He is an associate of Yogaraj Bhat.

Career

As screenwriter
Preetham made his debut with the film Mungaru Male. He wrote the script and co-wrote the screenplay with the director Yograj Bhat. The film had a simple story, that of the love and sacrifice of a young, carefree man. Preetam followed it up with two more simple tales - Geleya, directed by the long-time choreographer Harsha and the Ganesh starrer Aramane. Both did not attain the success of his first film. He has also written the story for his directorial debut, Haage Summane.

As director
Preetam was supposed to have directed the sequel to the hit Mungaaru Male. The film was supposed to have Ganesh and Ramya in the cast, however, both leads rejected the script that resulted in the shelving of the project. Preetam then picked up the script of Haage Summane for his debut, he cast relative newcomers as his lead pair - Kiran Srinivas and Suhasi. The technical team - the cinematographer Krishna, the editor Deepu S Kumar, music director Mano Murthy, lyricist Jayant Kaikini were all part of the original Mungaru Male team. The film released on 26 December 2008. It opened to a largely negative critical response, that Preetam had served Mungaaru Male again. However, Krishna's cinematography was largely praised and he won the Filmfare Award for the Best Cinematographer.

Preetam went on to direct his second directorial Maleyali Jotheyali starring Ganesh in the lead in 2009.  His next release was Johny Mera Naam Preethi Mera Kaam starring Duniya Vijay and Ramya in the lead roles.

In 2012, Preetham had one release:Jaanu starring Yash and Deepa Sannidhi. His next script was based on bromance involving 3 youngsters and their love lives. Preetham cast an entire group of emerging actors including the child-artist turned Radio Jockey, Vinayak Joshi among others. He titled the film Nam Duniya Nam Style. With this film, Preetham turned himself as a producer and produced the venture under the banner name of "Gubbi Talkies".

Filmography

References

External links
 

Living people
Kannada film directors
Screenwriters from Karnataka
Kannada film producers
Kannada screenwriters
Year of birth missing (living people)
21st-century Indian film directors
Film directors from Karnataka
Film producers from Karnataka